Mike Prendergast (born 21 May 1977) is an Irish rugby union coach who started his professional playing career with Munster. He also played a season with both Bourgoin in France and Gloucester in England before returning for one final season with Munster. He played as a scrum-half and represented Young Munster in the All-Ireland League.

Having previously been director of rugby for amateur Irish club Young Munster, Prendergast joined French club Grenoble as a skills coach in 2013, where former Leinster and Ireland hooker Bernard Jackman was then defence coach. Ahead of the 2017–18 Top 14 season, Prendergast joined Oyonnax as their attack coach, before joining Stade Français, where former Munster teammate Paul O'Connell was also a coach, as their backs and attack coach for the 2018–19 season, after Oyonnax were relegated from the Top 14.

After one season with Stade Français, Prendergast departed the club to join their Parisian rivals, Racing 92, where former Munster teammate Ronan O'Gara once coached and also where former Munster players Donnacha Ryan and Simon Zebo were playing at the time, as their backs coach on a long-term contract ahead of the 2019–20 season. Prendergast returned to Munster on a three-year contract from the 2022–23 season to join new head coach Graham Rowntree's coaching setup as an attack coach.

References

External links
Munster Profile
It's Rugby Profile

1977 births
Living people
Irish rugby union players
Young Munster players
Munster Rugby players
CS Bourgoin-Jallieu players
Gloucester Rugby players
Racing 92 coaches
Munster Rugby non-playing staff
Rugby union scrum-halves